Pascal Plisson is a French screenwriter and documentary filmmaker.

Life and career 
Pascal Plisson is a self-taught filmmaker who began his career in 1984 by performing stories (including sports coverage devoted to polo) on the American continent for various TV channels. One of his noted documentary films (Sur le chemin de l'école) 'On the way to school' was released in 2013.

Filmography

References

External links
 

French film directors
French male screenwriters
French screenwriters
Year of birth missing (living people)
Living people